Miguelópolis is a municipality in the state of São Paulo in Brazil. The population is 22,355 (2020 est.) in an area of 821 km². The elevation is 510 m.

References

Municipalities in São Paulo (state)